Daniel Adauf "Doc" Williams (April 3, 1899April 11, 1992) was an American football player.  He played four seasons in the National Football League (NFL) as a guard for the Duluth Kelleys/Eskimos (1923–1926). He was selected as a second-team quarterback on the 1924 All-Pro Team.

References

1899 births
1992 deaths
Sportspeople from St. Cloud, Minnesota
Players of American football from Minnesota
American football guards
St. Cloud State Huskies football players
Duluth Kelleys players